The Killing is a 1956 American film noir directed by Stanley Kubrick and produced by James B. Harris. It was written by Kubrick and Jim Thompson and based on Lionel White's novel Clean Break. It stars Sterling Hayden, Coleen Gray, and Vince Edwards, and features Marie Windsor, Elisha Cook Jr., Jay C. Flippen and Timothy Carey.

Plot
Johnny Clay is a veteran criminal planning one last heist before settling down and marrying Fay. He plans to steal $2 million from the money-counting room of a racetrack during a featured race. Johnny assembles a team consisting of a corrupt cop, a betting window teller to gain access to the backroom, a sharpshooter to shoot the favorite horse during the race to distract the crowd and keep the winnings from being paid out, a wrestler to provide another distraction by provoking a fight at the track bar, and a track bartender.

George Peatty, the teller, tells his wife, Sherry, about the impending robbery. Sherry is bitter at George for not delivering on the promises of wealth he made when they married, so George hopes telling her about the robbery will impress her and keep her from leaving him. Sherry does not believe him at first, but, after learning that the robbery is real, enlists her lover Val Cannon to steal the money from George and his associates.

The heist is successful, although the sharpshooter is shot and killed by a security guard. The conspirators gather at the apartment where they are to meet Johnny and divide the money. Before Johnny arrives, Val appears with an associate to hold them up. A shootout ensues and a badly wounded George emerges as the only man standing. He goes home and shoots Sherry before collapsing.

Arriving at the apartment, Johnny sees George staggering in the street and knows that something is wrong. He buys the biggest suitcase he can find and struggles to stuff all the money in. At the airport, Johnny and Fay must check the oversized bag as regular luggage. Johnny reluctantly complies. While the couple waits to board the plane, the suitcase falls off a baggage cart onto the runway and breaks open, its loose banknotes swept away by the gusts from the aircraft's propellers.

Fay and Johnny seek to flee, but are unable to hail a cab before the police are alerted to them. Fay urges Johnny to escape. He refuses, calmly accepting the futility. Muttering "What's the difference?", he is approached by two officers seeking to arrest him.

Cast

Production

While playing chess in Washington Square, Kubrick met producer James B. Harris, who was looking for a young new talent to produce for, having sold his film distribution company. Harris considered Kubrick "the most intelligent, most creative person [he had] ever come in contact with", and the two formed the Harris-Kubrick Pictures Corporation in 1955. Harris purchased the rights to Lionel White's novel Clean Break for $10,000, beating United Artists, which was interested in the film as a vehicle for Frank Sinatra. At Kubrick's suggestion they hired hardboiled fiction novelist Jim Thompson to write the script. United Artists told the pair that it would help finance the picture if Harris and Kubrick could find a high-profile actor to star. They signed Sterling Hayden, who agreed to accept $40,000. But Hayden wasn't a big enough star for UA, which wound up providing only $200,000 for the film; Harris financed the rest using $80,000 of his own money and a $50,000 loan from his father. The film was the first of three on which Harris and Kubrick collaborated as producer and director over less than ten years. Working titles for the film were Clean Break and Bed of Fear. It was the last feature film completely filmed by Kubrick in the United States (interiors for Spartacus were shot on Universal's Hollywood sound stages, but its battle exteriors were shot in Spain).

Three members of the cast—Hayden, Ted de Corsia and Timothy Carey—had appeared together the previous year in the low-budget noir film Crime Wave. The art director, Ruth Sobotka, was Kubrick's wife at the time. Kubrick and Harris moved from New York to L.A. to shoot the picture, and Kubrick went unpaid during the shooting, surviving on loans from Harris. In addition to Hayden, Kubrick cast actors from films noirs he liked, such as Timothy Carey, Ted de Corsia, Elisha Cook Jr. and Marie Windsor. He chose former professional wrestler and old chess friend Kola Kwariani to play an aging, chess-playing grappler. The Hollywood cinematographers' union told Kubrick that he could not be both director and cinematographer, so veteran cinematographer Lucien Ballard was hired to shoot the picture. He and Kubrick often clashed during filming. On one occasion Kubrick favored a long tracking shot, with the camera close to the actors with a 25mm wide-angle lens to provide slight distortion of the image, but Ballard moved it further away and began using a 50mm lens. Kubrick sternly ordered him to put the camera back or he would be fired.

Reception
Without a proper release across the U.S., The Killing performed poorly at the box office. In spite of a last-minute promotion as a second feature to Bandido!, it failed to turn a profit. But it garnered critical acclaim, landing on several critics' top-ten lists for 1956. Time wrongly predicted that it would "make a killing at the cash booths"—asserting that Kubrick "has shown more audacity with dialogue and camera than Hollywood has seen since the obstreperous Orson Welles went riding out of town on an exhibitors' poll"—as the film recorded a loss of $130,000. New York Times film critic A. H. Weiler wrote, "Though The Killing is composed of familiar ingredients and it calls for fuller explanations, it evolves as a fairly diverting melodrama. ... Aficionados of the sport of kings will discover that Mr. Kubrick's cameras have captured some colorful shots of the ponies at Bay Meadows track. Other observers should find The Killing an engrossing little adventure."

Variety liked the acting and wrote, "This story of a $2 million race track holdup and steps leading up to the robbery, occasionally told in a documentary style which at first tends to be somewhat confusing, soon settles into a tense and suspenseful vein which carries through to an unexpected and ironic windup ... Hayden socks over a restrained characterization, and Cook is a particular standout. Windsor is particularly good, as she digs the plan out of her husband and reveals it to her boyfriend." Kubrick and Harris thought the positive critical reception had made their presence known in Hollywood, but Max Youngstein of United Artists still considered them "not far from the bottom" of the pool of new talent at the time. Dore Schary of Metro-Goldwyn-Mayer was impressed with the film, and offered the duo $75,000 to write, direct and produce another, which became Paths of Glory.

Rotten Tomatoes rates The Killing 96% fresh, based on 45 reviews with an average score of 8.6/10. The consensus reads, "An expertly crafted noir with more on its mind than stylishly staged violence, The Killing establishes Stanley Kubrick as a filmmaker of uncommon vision and control." It has gained a cult following, among other Kubrick films. For example, Eddie Muller placed the film 15th among his top 25 favorite noir films, saying, "If you believe that a good script is a succession of great scenes, you can't do better than this. Hey, that scene was so good, let's do it again from somebody else's perspective".

In 1998, Jonathan Rosenbaum of the Chicago Reader included the film in his unranked list of the best American films not included on the AFI Top 100.

In 1999, film critic Mike Emery wrote, "Kubrick's camerawork was well on the way to finding the fluid style of his later work, and the sparse, low-budget circumstances give the film a raw, urgent sort of look. As good as the story and direction are, though, the true strength of The Killing lies in the characters and characterizations." The same year, director Peter Bogdanovich wrote in The New York Times that while The Killing did not make money, it, along with Paths of Glory, established "Kubrick's reputation as a budding genius among critics and studio executives."

On January 9, 2012, Roger Ebert added The Killing to his list of "Great Movies". In his opening remarks, Ebert writes, "Stanley Kubrick considered The Killing (1956) to be his first mature feature, after a couple of short warm-ups. He was 28 when it was released, having already been an obsessed chess player, a photographer for Look magazine and a director of March of Time newsreels. It's tempting to search here for themes and a style he would return to in his later masterpieces, but few directors seemed so determined to make every one of his films an individual, free-standing work. Seeing it without his credit, would you guess it was by Kubrick? Would you connect Dr. Strangelove with Barry Lyndon?"

Awards

Nominations
 BAFTA Film Award, Best Film from any Source, USA; 1957.

Influence
Quentin Tarantino has said that this film was an influence on Reservoir Dogs, that he thought of that film as "my Killing, my take on that kind of heist movie."

Home media
A digitally restored version of The Killing was released on DVD and Blu-ray by The Criterion Collection, which also included Killer's Kiss as a bonus feature. On July 26, 2022, Kino Lorber (under the KL Studio Classics line) released a 4k Ultra HD Blu-ray edition of the film from a new remaster of the original negatives with new audio commentary by film historian Alan K. Rode.

See also
List of American films of 1956
Heist film

References

Sources

External links

 
 
 
 
 
The Killing: Kubrick’s Clockwork an essay by Haden Guest at the Criterion Collection
The Killers Inside Me an essay by Chuck Stephens at the Criterion Collection
 The Killing film trailer at the Internet Movie Database

1956 films
1950s crime thriller films
American crime thriller films
American heist films
American black-and-white films
American nonlinear narrative films
1950s English-language films
Film noir
Films based on American novels
Films directed by Stanley Kubrick
Films with screenplays by Stanley Kubrick
Uxoricide in fiction
Films scored by Gerald Fried
Procedural films
1950s American films